Ihsim Subdistrict  is a Syrian nahiyah (subdistrict) located in Ariha District in Idlib.  According to the Syria Central Bureau of Statistics (CBS), Ihsim Subdistrict had a population of 65409 in the 2004 census.

References 

Subdistricts of Idlib Governorate